Cornelius (Jakobs)
Cornelius (Rodousakis)
Cornelius (Titov)